The Death of Artemio Cruz is a novel written in 1962 by Mexican writer Carlos Fuentes. It is considered to be a milestone in the Latin American Boom.

Plot summary
Artemio Cruz, a corrupt soldier, politician, journalist, tycoon, and lover, lies on his deathbed, recalling the shaping events of his life, from the Mexican Revolution through the development of the Institutional Revolutionary Party. His family crowds around, pressing him to reveal the location of his will; a priest provides extreme unction, angling for a deathbed confession and reconciliation with the Church (while Artemio indulges in obscene thoughts about the birth of Jesus); his private secretary has come with audiotapes of various corrupt dealings, many with gringo diplomats and speculators. Punctuating the sordid record of betrayal is Cruz's awareness of his failing body and his keen attachment to sensual life. Finally his thoughts decay into a drawn-out death.

Themes and significance
The Death of Artemio Cruz is today "widely regarded as a seminal work of modern Spanish American literature". Like many of Fuentes' works, the novel used rotating narrators, a technique critic Karen Hardy described as demonstrating "the complexities of a human or national personality". The novel is heavily influenced by Orson Welles' Citizen Kane, and attempts literary parallels to Welles' techniques, including close-up, cross-cutting, deep focus, and flashback. Like Kane, the novel begins with the titular protagonist on his deathbed; the story of Cruz's life is then filled in by flashbacks as the novel moves between past and present. Cruz is a former soldier of the Mexican Revolution who has become wealthy and powerful through "violence, blackmail, bribery, and brutal exploitation of the workers". The novel explores the corrupting effects of power and criticizes the distortion of the revolutionaries' original aims through "class domination, Americanization, financial corruption, and failure of land reform".

The Death of Artemio Cruz is dedicated to the sociologist C. Wright Mills, whom Fuentes called "the true voice of North America and great friend in the struggle for the people in Latin America."

Film rights
In 2012, Chatrone LLC optioned both film and television rights to the novel.

Editions

References

Further reading

External links
 

1962 fantasy novels
Novels by Carlos Fuentes
Mexican magic realism novels
Novels set in Mexico
Novels set in the Mexican Revolution